von Braun, named after the rocket pioneer Wernher von Braun, is a lunar impact crater located near the northwestern limb of the Moon. It lies along the western edge of the Oceanus Procellarum, to the northeast of the crater Lavoisier. The northeastern rim of this crater is on the edge of the Sinus Roris, a bay feature in the northwestern part of the Oceanus Procellarum. Due to its proximity to the limb, this crater appears significantly foreshortened when viewed from the Earth.

This crater is somewhat distorted from a true circular shape, and is slightly longer to the north and south. The outer rim has undergone some erosion due to subsequent impacts. Most notably, the crater Lavoisier E is attached to the western rim, and the outer rampart falls across part of the inner wall of von Braun. There are small craters along the rim to the southeast and the east, and craterlets along the northeast and southwestern rims. The inner wall has slumped along the southeast and northwestern sides to form a terrace-like shelf. The interior floor is relatively level and featureless, with a few small craterlets marking the surface.

This crater was previously identified as Lavoisier D before being assigned a name by the IAU.

External links
 Google Moon - von Braun

References

 
 
 
 
 
 
 
 
 
 
 
 

Impact craters on the Moon
Wernher von Braun